Castle House may refer to:
Castle House, Bridgwater, an 1851 house in Somerset, England
Castle House, Dedham, housing the Sir Alfred Munnings Art Museum in Essex, England
Castle House, Laugharne, a Georgian Mansion in Carmarthenshire, Wales
Castle House, Usk, a listed building in Monmouthshire, Wales
Castle House building, Ludlow Castle, Shropshire, England
Castle House, a former Sheffield Co-operative Society store in South Yorkshire, England
Castle House, now the site of Strata SE1, London, England
Castle House, now the site of Old College, Aberystwyth, Ceredigion, Wales
Castle House, or Bailieborough Castle, County Cavan, Ireland
Castle House, Dunoon, Argyll and Bute, Scotland.
Castle House School, Newport, Shropshire, England

See also
The Mystery at Castle House, a 1982 Australian film for children
Sir George Sutton, 1st Baronet, of Castle House, Banstead, Surrey, a Sutton baronet